Bianca Maria Meda (c. 1665 – c. 1700) was an Italian composer. Little is known about her life, but she was a Benedictine nun at the convent of San Martino del Leano in Pavia.  She published only one work, a collection of motets, Mottetti a 1, 2, 3, e 4 voci, con violini in Bologna in 1691.

References

Women classical composers
Italian Baroque composers
1660s births
1700s deaths
Benedictines
17th-century Italian Roman Catholic religious sisters and nuns
17th-century Italian composers
17th-century women composers
People from Pavia